The Shire of Lake Grace is a local government area in the eastern Wheatbelt region of Western Australia, about  ESE of the state capital, Perth.

History
The Lake Grace Road District was gazetted on 22 December 1922. On 1 July 1961, it became a Shire under the Local Government Act 1960, which reformed all remaining road districts into shires.

Towns and localities
The towns and localities of the Shire of Lake Grace with population and size figures based on the most recent Australian census:

Heritage-listed places

As of 2023, 231 places are heritage-listed in the Shire of Lake Grace, of which five are on the State Register of Heritage Places.

References

External links
 

 
Lake Grace